Fish n' Chips is a 2011 British-Cypriot drama film written and directed by Elias Demetriou.

Plot 
Fish n' chips follows the story of Andy, a Greek Cypriot immigrant in London, who works like a slave with his ex-East German girlfriend Karin and her daughter, Emma, in a fish shop, owned by Jimmy a Turkish Cypriot (he uses Jimmy as a nickname. His real name is Hassan).

Andy's old mother suffers from dementia and is causing Andy a lot of trouble, as she often runs away. The film starts with her escaping, imagining that she is returning to her homeland. So Andy finds the perfect excuse to take his mother to Cyprus and at the same time, he can offer his “family” some rest and relaxation. Jimmy, the owner of the shop, though, has different ideas since he depends heavily on Andy’s skill and phenomenal output. The two men argue and Andy merely manages to get fired.

Andy, who has already made up his mind to propose marriage to Karin, decides not to tell her that they have lost their job. So, they go to Cyprus for holidays.  Staying with Andy’s brother Anestis and his family in an impressively huge house, Andy, sensing how delighted Karin and her daughter are to be in Cyprus, persuades them to follow their dreams by opening their own fish ‘n chip shop there.

Unfortunately the enterprise flops since Andy failed to realize that the beach where he had been led to open his shop by his brother, is frequented by Cypriot locals who are not fish n' chip lovers. The failure brings misery and creates conflict between Andy and his brother, and between Karin and Emma. Andy refuses to face reality and struggles to keep the shop going, but he only succeeds in being left alone by everyone, specially by his girlfriend Karin and Emma who both go back to London to return to their previous job at Jimmy’s Fish shop.

However his mother - who keeps running away from him searching for her own homeland even being in Cyprus - gets inside her own house in Northern Cyprus which is now bought by a retired British old lady sold by his own brother behind his back.

The final blow for Andy comes when he finds that his real father was not killed during the war by the Turkish army as he was always believed but it is Jimmy the owner of the fish shop in London. The hidden love story between his mother and Hassan (Jimmy) unfolds and shakes his stereotypes.

Andy realises that he is nothing more than a tourist in his own homeland, and that home is where a person fits best. Andy, now with the scales lifted from his eyes, returns to London, home, where he finds that Hassan (Jimmy) has given him the fish shop in London.

Cast
 Marios Ioannou as Andy
 Marlene Kaminsky as Karin
 Anne-Marie O'Sullivan as Emma
 Diomedes Koufteros as Anestis
 Alkistis Pavlidou as Mother
 Margarita Zachariou as Maria
 Stephanie Neofytoy as Anna
 Andreas Phylactou as Yorgos
 Roland Manookian as Dave

References

External links
 

2011 films
2011 drama films
Cypriot drama films
2010s Greek-language films
English-language Cypriot films
2010s English-language films
British drama films
2011 multilingual films
British multilingual films
2010s British films